Sergey Petrov (born 19 April 1965, Volkhov) is a Russian political figure and a deputy of the 5th, 6th, 7th, and 8th State Dumas. 

From 1989 to 2001, Petrov served in command and engineering positions at the A.F. Mozhaysky Military-Space Academy. In 2002, he co-founded the development company SVP group. In 2008, he started working as the head of the North-West Interregional Coordinating Council of the United Russia. Petrov started his political career in 2007 when he was elected deputy of the 5th State Duma. In 2011, 2016, 2021, he was re-elected as deputy of the 6th, 7th, and 8th State Dumas from the Leningrad Oblast constituency.

Awards  
 Order of Friendship

References

1965 births
Living people
United Russia politicians
21st-century Russian politicians
Eighth convocation members of the State Duma (Russian Federation)